Dagoba Organic Chocolate is a brand of chocolate founded in 2001 by Frederick Schilling and owned by The Hershey Company since 2006. The name Dagoba is Sinhalese from dhatu-garbha, Sanskrit words for "hemispherical dome" i.e.stupa.

Products 

Dagoba currently sells specialty chocolate bars, baking chocolate, cacao powder, chocodrops, and drinking chocolate.

As of August 2012, all products are Rainforest Alliance Certified, and the company has dropped fair trade certification, which used to apply to the cacao powder, drinking chocolates, and the discontinued Conacado bar, 73% ChocoDrops and syrup. 100% of the cacao beans used to produce Dagoba Chocolate products are Rainforest Alliance Certified.In October 2006, Dagoba was acquired by The Hershey Company. Hershey's CEO Richard H. Lenny stated in a press release "Organic chocolate products are experiencing dramatic growth as consumers continue to trade up for indulgent, high-quality products."

Chocolate bars

Here is a list of the current product line of Dagoba chocolate bars. Percentages indicate the cacao content.
84% Pure extra Bittersweet
Rich Dark 74% Bittersweet
Picante 74%: Spicy chocolate containing chilies, cacao nibs, nutmeg, orange and vanilla.
Dark 59% Semisweet
Lavender Blueberry 59%: Contains wild blueberries and flavored with lavender essential oil.
Ginger Lime 37%: Milk flavored with crystallized ginger and lime essential oil.
Milk 37%
White Chocolate 37%: Contains raspberries, vanilla and peppermint essential oil.

Dagoba Chocolate also produces a line of Drinking Chocolates:
Unsweetened: Non-dutched cacao powder with bits of 100% dark chocolate.
Authentic: Non-dutched cacao powder with bits of 100% dark chocolate, and cane sugar.
Xocolatl: Non-dutched cacao powder, 100% chocolate bits, cane sugar, chiles and cinnamon.

Dagoba Chocolate also produces the following items:
 Cacao powder, non-dutched
 Chocolate Drops, 74% bittersweet
 Baking Bars in 59% and 100%

References

External links
 

 

Brand name chocolate
Companies based in Ashland, Oregon
American companies established in 2001
American chocolate companies
Organic chocolate
2001 establishments in Oregon
The Hershey Company brands
Food and drink companies established in 2001